Nevada's entry into statehood in the United States on October 31, 1864, in the midst of the American Civil War, was expedited by Union sympathizers in order to ensure the state's participation in the 1864 presidential election in support of President Abraham Lincoln. Thus Nevada became one of only two states admitted to the Union during the war (the other being West Virginia) and earned the nickname that appears on the Nevada state flag today: "Battle Born".

Because its population at statehood was less than 40,000, Nevada was only able to muster 1,200 men to fight for the Union Army, but Confederate forces never posed any serious threat of territorial seizure, and Nevada remained firmly in Union control for the duration of the war. Largely isolated from the major theaters of the conflict, Nevada nonetheless served as an important target for political and economic strategists before and after gaining statehood. Its main contribution to the cause came from its burgeoning mining industry: at least $400 million in silver ore from the Comstock Lode was used to finance the federal war effort. In addition, the state hosted a number of Union military posts.

Admission into statehood

Prior to the Civil War, the geographic area that makes up present-day Nevada belonged to several different U.S. territories. The region had long held economic ties to northern industry and financing, especially after the discovery of gold and silver in the eastern Sierra Nevada in the late 1850s, and was populated predominantly by secular Unionists who opposed slavery and sought some sort of territorial incorporation to bolster the area's economic growth: either through annexation by California or organization as an independent territory. Many early Nevadans also sought political segregation from Mormons living to the east, with whom they were often engaged in ideological conflict.

The majority of what is now Nevada was separated from the Territory of Utah and formally organized as the Territory of Nevada on March 2, 1861, just as southern states began seceding from the Union and joining the Confederacy.

The Nevada Territory was short-lived, however, as its entry into full statehood in the United States was expedited in 1864. President Abraham Lincoln sought the support of an additional Northern state that would presumably vote for his re-election and help force pro-Northern ideas into new amendments to the United States Constitution, specifically the 13th Amendment, by which he proposed to abolish slavery. Union sympathizers were so eager to gain statehood for Nevada that they rushed to send the entire state constitution by telegraph to the United States Congress before the 1864 presidential election since they did not believe that sending it by train would guarantee its arrival on time. The constitution was sent October 26–27, 1864, less than two weeks before the election on November 8. The transmission took two days; it consisted of 16,543 words and cost $4303.27 to send. It was, at the time, the longest telegraph transmission ever made, a record it held for seventeen years until a copy of the 118,000-word Revised Version of the New Testament was sent by telegraph on May 22, 1881.

Lincoln and Congress moved quickly to approve the constitution and Nevada was officially admitted to the Union as the 36th state on October 31, 1864. It had fewer than 40,000 inhabitants when it gained statehood, far fewer than the population at statehood of any other state.

Nevada volunteers

The Nevada volunteer group was made of residents from Carson City, Virginia City, Reno, and Dayton. This group was originally considered to be a part of the California volunteer group but, was actually organized, ran, and implemented in Carson City by Charles D. Douglas. The officers and members of the volunteer group were from the general public and used their own firearms while in battle. Most of the officers were veterans of the Mexican American War and many held elected public positions prior to serving in the volunteer forces. As the volunteer groups began to grow and become larger, more training was implemented. In 1863 at the outpost of fort Churchill, California was tasked with training Nevada Volunteers to be officers adequate to the standards of the United States Army. For the most part, these groups served without pay, but on occasion would reserve little bits of money from local government or by the local businesses, sometimes both. The work these volunteers did was out of gratitude and loyalty to the Union they had joined during the time of its establishment. In total, Nevada sent 1,200 men to fight for the Union. In May 1863, Nevada raised the 1st Battalion Nevada Volunteer Cavalry. In the summer of 1864, a battalion of infantry, the 1st Battalion Nevada Volunteer Infantry was mustered in. The adjutant-general of Nevada reported that since the beginning of the Civil War, 34 officers and 1,158 enlisted men had voluntarily enlisted in the service of the United States from Nevada. These troops were not used against the southern armies, but instead protected the central overland route and settlements on the frontier from Indians. With the units of California Volunteers engaged in the same service, they made incursions into Indian country, exploring large sections of territory which had never been entered by American forces, and had frequent skirmishes with the Indians. The Nevada volunteer group and all of the forts, outposts, training grounds and other military areas can be traced through history to today’s current Army and Air National Guard in Nevada.

Sanitary Commission 
During the time of the Civil War, the Nation lacked an organization to help administer aid and help the wounded or sick soldiers. Similar to the role the Red Cross played later in history, The Sanitary Commission sought to find a way to help the wounded, sick and disabled soldiers of the war. This Commission was started in 1862 after the war had already begun and was disembodied in 1865. This wasn’t only money donated. The commission of volunteers created the Sanitary fund, which got its funding from subscriptions or by any other way people saw fit to assist the cause. They were able to create excitement around the idea and generate revenue by doing different promotional acts. The event brought both the Democratic and Republican parties together to help raise money for the war. It started out as a wager between the owner of a grocery store (Reuel Gridley, Democrat) and the collector of internal revenue for Nevada Dr. H. S. Herrick, Republican. The loser of the wager had to carry a fifty pound sack of flower from Clifton to Austin (about one mile) and if the loser was a Republican he had to march to "Dixie" and if Democrat he had to march to "John Brown's Body." Dr. H. S. Herrick won the wager and in turn the southern sympathizer marched through the streets  carrying the flour sack, decorated with American flags and painted red white and blue. Although not everyone in Nevada was for joining the Union, this helped to bring the state together to focus its efforts on an issue that both sides could see was good and beneficial for the overall well-being of the nation. Also, this program helped to focus the attention of the nation on the generosity and community of the people living in Nevada.

Comstock Lode
However, Nevada's main contribution to the war was the Comstock Lode, whose silver totaling $400 million financed the Union war effort to defeat the southern states. A common belief is that Nevada achieved early statehood due to its silver, but its admission to the Union was much more influenced by political concerns, not economic.

Confederate sympathizers in Nevada were not unheard of during the war; in fact, of the Pacific Coast states, none had more southern supporters. In Virginia City, in particular, sentiment towards the warring sides was split evenly. However, in strict military fashion, any strong sentiment that was pro-Confederate was struck down as Union army soldiers arrested the sympathizers and jailed them at Fort Churchill. The only time a Confederate flag was flown in the state was at a stone saloon, and defended at gunpoint by one of the saloon's owners until the owner's partner convinced him to change the flag to the United States flag before troops from Fort Churchill forced the matter. This perhaps contributed to the commander of Fort Churchill feeling additional paranoia about pro-Confederate sympathies in mining camps, and throughout the war Nevada was under martial law.

One particularly pro-Union organization was the Virginia City Fire Department. Many of them were originally from New York and had strong feelings for the New York Fire Zouaves they had known when they lived back east. When news arrived of the Union defeat at the First Battle of Bull Run, with the New York Fire Zouaves in particular suffering heavy casualties, it was determined by the Virginia City firemen that they would book no celebrations by pro-Confederates, and they bullied any southern sympathizer they met that day by fist and weapons.

Military posts in Nevada during the Civil War
 Mormon Station (1849–1910)
 Fort Churchill (1860–1869)
 Camp Schell (1860–1862)
 Fort Schellbourne (1862–1869)
 Camp Nye (1861–1865)
 Fort Ruby (1862–1869)
 Camp Smoke Creek (1862–1864)
 Camp Dun Glen (1863, 1865–1866)
 Fort Trinity, 1863–1864
 Antelope Station, 1864
 Fort Baker, 1864
 Deep Creek Station, 1864
 Quinn River Camp, 1865
 Fort McDermitt, 1865–1889
 Camp McGarry, 1865–1868.
 Camp McKee, 1865–1866
 Camp Overend, 1865

See also
 History of Nevada

Notes

References

External links
  Map of the Territory and Military Department of Utah 1860
  Map Of Nevada Territory 1863
 Virginia City, Nevada Civil War site photos

 
Pacific Coast Theater of the American Civil War
American Civil War by state